Sabine Laruelle (born 2 June 1965) is a Belgian politician and a member of the liberal party Mouvement Réformateur.

She has been federal minister for the Self-employed and Agriculture (2003-2008), federal minister for the Self-employed, Agriculture and Science Policy (2008-2011). Sabine Laruelle sit again in the Federal Government from December 2011 to October 2014 as Minister of the Self-employed, SME's and Agriculture. She is also member of the Municipal council of Gembloux, where she lives nowadays.

Sabine Laruelle is an Agronomist engineer and environment advisor with a Certificate in administrative management.

External links 
 Official Website
 https://web.archive.org/web/20130415200016/http://laruelle.belgium.be/

1965 births
Living people
Presidents of the Senate (Belgium)
Ministers of Agriculture of Belgium
Reformist Movement politicians
People from Huy

21st-century Belgian women politicians
21st-century Belgian politicians